Džemil Cerić (born 7 August 1949 in Tuzla, FPR Yugoslavia) is a retired Bosnian-Herzegovinian and Yugoslav professional footballer.

Club career
A graduate of the Sloboda Tuzla youth department, he started his senior career with Croatian powerhouse Dinamo Zagreb in 1968. He further played for Sloboda Tuzla and FK Sarajevo, before retiring prematurely because of chronic injuries in 1977.

References

External links
 Dinamo profile - Povijest Dinama

1949 births
Living people
People from Novi Grad, Bosnia and Herzegovina
Association football midfielders
Yugoslav footballers
GNK Dinamo Zagreb players
FK Sloboda Tuzla players
FK Sarajevo players
Yugoslav First League players
Yugoslav Second League players